Romain Heinrich (born  in Colmar) is a French bobsledder.

Heinrich competed at the 2014 Winter Olympics for France. He teamed with driver Loic Costerg in the two-man event, finishing 20th, and in the France-1 sled with Costerg, Florent Ribet and Elly Lefort in the four-man event, finishing 17th.

As of April 2014, his best showing at the World Championships is 17th, in the 2013 two-man event.

Heinrich made his World Cup debut in December 2011. As of April 2014, his best finish is 14th, in two events in 2013-14.

References

1990 births
Living people
Sportspeople from Colmar
Olympic bobsledders of France
Bobsledders at the 2014 Winter Olympics
Bobsledders at the 2018 Winter Olympics
Bobsledders at the 2022 Winter Olympics
French male bobsledders
21st-century French people